Dan Săndulescu (born 1 April 1985, Pitesti) is a Romanian footballer. He is currently playing for Moscardó.

External links

1985 births
Living people
Romanian footballers
Association football defenders
FC Argeș Pitești players
ASC Daco-Getica București players
CS Minaur Baia Mare (football) players
FC Bihor Oradea players
CS Mioveni players
FC Universitatea Cluj players
FC Rapid București players
Liga I players
Liga II players
Sportspeople from Pitești